Disney's Grand Floridian Resort & Spa is a Victorian themed hotel and spa located at the Walt Disney World Resort in Florida. The property opened on June 28, 1988, as the Grand Floridian Beach Resort. The name changed to Disney's Grand Floridian Resort & Spa during the fall of 1997.

The Grand Floridian is categorized as a "deluxe" resort. It is also distinguished as Disney's flagship and most opulent resort.

History and influences 
The Grand Floridian was inspired by the Victorian-era beach resorts built along Florida's east coast during the late 19th and early 20th century. Its exterior is modelled after the Mount Washington Resort in Bretton Woods, New Hampshire, and Hotel del Coronado in Coronado, California, with red gabled roofs and white walls.  Additional design inspiration was taken from the former Belleview-Biltmore Hotel in Belleair, Florida. 

Initially, Walt Disney wanted a Polynesian resort (reflecting Adventureland), the Contemporary Resort to echo Tomorrowland, and other resorts that mirrored the 'lands' of the Magic Kingdom. Main Street and The Grand Floridian act as analogous reflections. The resort was designed by the Disney company and executed by the architectural firm Wimberly, Allison, Tong & Goo.

Along with Disney's Polynesian Village Resort, the Grand Floridian sits on the shores of the man-made Seven Seas Lagoon near the Magic Kingdom. The hotel occupies land that had been earmarked for an Asian-themed resort during the initial development of Walt Disney World Resort in the late 1960s. The Beach Boys performed at the Grand Floridian in 1988 to film the music video for their song Kokomo. In 1992, a  convention center opened adjacent to the hotel, which contains a business center.

Incidents

 On October 9, 1989, a 33-year-old woman from Glen Cove, New York, was killed when a tiny speedboat collided with a ferry boat. She and her 8-year-old son were broadsided by the ferry while trying to videotape friends and family members who were water skiing in the Seven Seas Lagoon. A crew member and a visitor on the ferry dove into the water and rescued her son. The boy was not hurt in the accident. The family sued Disney for $240 million, claiming that the ferry's operators should have seen the speedboat before it came so close.
 On June 14, 2016, a two-year-old child was fatally attacked by an American alligator which dragged him from the shore of the resort's beach into the Seven Seas Lagoon. The child's body was recovered a day later.

Gallery

See also

Victoria & Albert's

References

External links

 

Commercial buildings completed in 1988
Hotels established in 1988
Hotel buildings completed in 1988
Grand Floridian Resort and Spa
Destination spas
Convention centers in Florida
1988 establishments in Florida
Disney Vacation Club